The Sokollu Mehmed Pasha Mosque is a 16th-century Ottoman mosque located in Istanbul, Turkey.

The mosque is situated in Azapkapı neighborhood of Beyoğlu district in Istanbul. It is directly beside the Atatürk Bridge across the Golden Horn, but there was no bridge here at the time the mosque was built. It was designed by Ottoman imperial architect Mimar Sinan (c. 1488/1490-1588) and built for the grand vizier Sokollu Mehmed Pasha (in office 1565–1579) in 1578. It is one of the three mosques with the same name built by Mimar Sinan in Istanbul.

See also
 List of Friday mosques designed by Mimar Sinan
 List of mosques in Istanbul

References

Gallery

External links
Sokullu Mehmet Paşa Camii (Azapkapı), ArchNet.
Gallery with many pictures, Pbase

Religious buildings and structures completed in 1578
Mimar Sinan buildings
Ottoman mosques in Istanbul
1578 establishments in the Ottoman Empire
Beyoğlu
16th-century mosques